Jan Mrvík (born 29 March 1939) is a Czech rower who competed for Czechoslovakia in the 1964 Summer Olympics.

He was born in Prague.

In 1964 he was a crew member of the Czechoslovak boat which won the bronze medal in the eights event.

References

1939 births
Living people
Czech male rowers
Czechoslovak male rowers
Olympic rowers of Czechoslovakia
Rowers at the 1964 Summer Olympics
Olympic bronze medalists for Czechoslovakia
Olympic medalists in rowing
Medalists at the 1964 Summer Olympics
European Rowing Championships medalists
Rowers from Prague